The Proton Perdana is a series of four-door mid-size saloon cars produced by Malaysian automobile manufacturer Proton.

There are two notable generations of the Proton Perdana. The first generation Proton Perdana was a badge engineered seventh generation Mitsubishi Eterna, developed as the result of a collaboration between Proton and Mitsubishi Motors. Proton refers to the 1995-1998 (non-V6) models as the first generation Proton Perdana and the 1998-2010 (V6) models as the second generation Proton Perdana. However, the general public commonly refers both 1995-1998 (non-V6) models and 1998-2010 (V6) models based on the seventh generation Mitsubishi Eterna as first generation Proton Perdana's.

The second generation Proton Perdana is a badge engineered eighth generation Honda Accord, developed as the result of a collaboration between Proton and Honda Motor Company, Ltd. Proton refers to the 2013-2020 models as the third and fourth generation Proton Perdana. However, the general public commonly refers both 2013-2015 models and 2016-2020 models based on the eight generation Honda Accord as second generation Proton Perdana's.

First generation (1995-2010) 
The first generation Proton Perdana is a badge engineered seventh generation Mitsubishi Eterna, developed as the result of a collaboration between Proton and Mitsubishi Motors. About 80,000 first generation Proton Perdana were sold between 1995 and 2013.

Second generation (2013–2020)

References 

Perdana